Raagam Thaanam Pallavi is a 1980 Indian Malayalam-language film,  directed by A. T. Abu. The film stars Srividya, M. G. Soman, Janardanan and Kuthiravattam Pappu in the lead roles. The film has musical score by M. K. Arjunan.

Cast
M. G. Soman as Jayachandran
Srividya as Nandinikutty
Sankaradi as Jayachandran's father
Kuthiravattam Pappu as Gopalankutty
Meena as Jayachandran's mother
Kottarakkara Sreedharan Nair as Marar
Sreenivasan as Appukuttan
Ravi Menon as Venu
Jalaja as Jaanu
Geetha (old) as Cicily

Soundtrack
The music was composed by M. K. Arjunan and the lyrics were written by A. P. Gopalan.

References

External links
 

1980 films
1980s Malayalam-language films
Films directed by A. T. Abu